Jared Palmer and Richey Reneberg were the defending champions but only Palmer competed that year with Donald Johnson.

Johnson and Palmer won in the final 7–6(7–3), 6–2 against Marcelo Ríos and Sjeng Schalken.

Seeds

  Donald Johnson /  Jared Palmer (champions)
  John-Laffnie de Jager /  Ellis Ferreira (semifinals)
  Michael Hill /  Jeff Tarango (first round)
  Alex O'Brien /  Jonathan Stark (quarterfinals)

Draw

External links
 Main draw

Tennis Channel Open
2001 ATP Tour
2001 Tennis Channel Open